Prasanjit Das (born 11 July 1987) is an Indian former cricketer who played for the Bengal cricket team. He played as a right-handed batsman and occasional leg break bowler.

References 

1987 births
Living people
Indian cricketers
Bengal cricketers